Year Million is a six-part documentary and science fiction television series produced by National Geographic, which premiered on May 15, 2017, on their channel. The series received two Emmy Award nominations,
including a Primetime Emmy for its narrator Laurence Fishburne. The series is based on the 2008 book Year Million: Science at the Far Edge of Knowledge by Damien Broderick. The narrative alternates tells the story of a family of three in the future, using 2016 interviews to explain events unfolding in the story. The series was filmed in Budapest.

Synopsis
Investigating the ramifications of a variety of potentially world-changing inventions, the series visits a cast of characters representing a typical American family in several different possible timelines. Ray Kurzweil, Michio Kaku, Peter Diamandis and Brian Greene guide the documentary aspect, discussing possible changes the future might hold based on their research: Artificial Intelligence, Man merging with Machine, the human species becoming an interplanetary entity. Exploring life in both the near and the far future, where artificial intelligence is ubiquitous and advances in science have radically extended our lifespans. The series aims to show that communication, work and education will be revolutionized through virtual telepathy.

Accolades
The series' narrator, Laurence Fishburne, was nominated for a Primetime Emmy Award, with a further Craft Emmy Nomination for Outstanding Lighting Direction and Scenic Design.

Cast
Each episode of the series is broken up into first narrated scenes, then interviews with scientists and futurologists; the docudrama segments fit around the interviews and narration to illustrate how technological changes might impact a regular family.

Laurence Fishburne as Narrator

Interviews
Ray Kurzweil
Michio Kaku
Peter Diamandis
Brian Greene

Drama
Vinette Robinson - Eva
Reece Ritchie - Oscar
Dinita Gohil - Sajani
Olive Gray - Jess
Joe Corrigall - Damon
Siobahn Dillon - Mother
Miklós Bányai - Newscaster

Episodes

References

External links 
 

2017 American television series debuts
2017 American television series endings
2010s American documentary television series
2010s American science fiction television series
English-language television shows
Documentary films about science
Documentary films about outer space
Documentary television series about technology
National Geographic (American TV channel) original programming
Science education television series
Documentary television shows about evolution